The Polish American Historical Association (PAHA), founded in 1942, is a scholarly not-for-profit association dedicated to the study of Polish American history and culture. Originally a section of the larger Polish Institute of Arts and Sciences in America, PAHA soon became an independent organization. On September 11, 1942, historian Oskar Halecki proposed an autonomous historical institution and chose Mieczyslaw Haiman of the Polish Museum of America in Chicago as its founding president. Since 1944, PAHA publishes Polish American Studies, an interdisciplinary journal focused primarily in social science and the humanities relating to American Polonia. It is edited by Anna Jaroszyńska-Kirchmann. PAHA is an affiliate society of the American Historical Association.

Structure
PAHA is governed by a board of directors, elected by the membership of the Association, consisting of eight officers and twelve council members. Elections are held every two years. Lists of current and past officers can be found on the PAHA website.

Publications
In addition to its scholarly journal, Polish American Studies, edited by Prof. Anna Jaroszynska-Kirchmann (for the previous 30 years edited by Prof. James Pula), the organization publishes a semi-annual PAHA Newsletter, and a blog (edited by Dr. Anna Muller). The Association's The Polish American Encyclopedia, edited by Prof. James Pula, was published in 2011 by McFarland Books. Other notable publications sponsored by PAHA include James Pula, ed., PAHA: A 75th Anniversary History of the Polish American Historical Association (Polish American Historical Association, 2017) and Ewa E. Barczyk, ed., Footprints of Polonia: Polish Historical Sites Across North America (Hippocrene, 2022).

Conferences
Along with the American Historical Association, the PAHA hosts an annual conference. The 79th Annual Meeting took place in Philadelphia in January 2023.

Awards
Each year at its annual meeting, PAHA bestows awards for deserving articles, books, scholars, and others. PAHA also bestows Creative Arts Awards, the Pula Distinguished Service Award, and Young Scholar Travel Grants.  Most awards are made annually, and some occasionally.

Special projects
PAHA makes appeals for memoirs and historical artifacts among Americans of Polish descent to aid in its historical research. PAHA secured archival storage space at the Central Connecticut State Library with strong interest in acquiring firsthand memoirs and documents from the postwar Polish American diaspora and their current descendants.

References

Further reading
 Bukowczyk, John J., "'Harness for Posterity the Values of a Nation': Fifty Years of the Polish American Historical Association and 'Polish American Studies,'" Polish American Studies 50.2 (Autumn 1993), 5-100.
 Bukowczyk, John J., "Keynote for the 75th Anniversary of PAHA: The Polish American Historical Association - Its Place, Role and Legacy within the Field of U.S. Ethnic History." Polish American Studies 76.2 (Autumn 2019),15-23.
 Jaroszynska-Kirchmann, Anna D., "The Polish American Historical Association: Looking Back, Looking Forward," Polish American Studies 65.1 (Spring 2008), 57–76.
 Pula, James S.; Pacyga, Dominic A.; Pienkos, Donald; Erdmans, Mary Patrice; Walaszek, Adam; Kozaczka, Grazyna A.,"Forum on Polish American Studies," Polish American Studies 77.1 (Spring 2020), 9-54.
 Pula, James S., ed., PAHA: A 75th Anniversary History of the Polish American Historical Association (Polish American Historical Association, 2017).
 Walaszek, Adam. "Has the 'Salt-Water Curtain' Been Raised Up? Globalizing Historiography of Polish America." Polish American Studies 73.1 (Spring 2016), 47-67.

Polish-American culture in Connecticut
Polish-American history
1942 establishments in the United States
Scientific societies based in the United States
Historical societies of the United States
Organizations based in Connecticut
Organizations established in 1942